Medumi Parish is an administrative unit of Augšdaugava Municipality in the Selonia region of Latvia.

Towns, villages and settlements of Medumi Parish 
 Medumi

 
Parishes of Latvia
Selonia